Farm Crime is a Canadian true crime documentary series which premiered on CBC's online streaming service, CBC Gem (formerly the CBC Player), in August 2018. Created by Geoff Morrison and produced by Toronto-based production company Big Cedar Films, the series investigates unconventional crimes in the world of farming and agriculture.

The series was one of the first to be commissioned exclusively for the CBC Gem streaming platform, and was reported by CBC to have been the most-streamed original unscripted series over a seven-day period and a twelve-week period when its first season premiered. In December 2020, it was announced that Warner Bros. Unscripted Television optioned the format rights to the show, and that an American version of the show is in development.

Episodes

Series overview 
The series documents the stories of people who have been victims of agricultural crime. Each 10-15 minute episode examines a different incident, usually a theft, and how it affects the victims both emotionally and financially. The series also explores the many diverse aspects of the agricultural industry in Canada, with each episode taking place in different provinces across Canada. The first season of the series tackles crimes such as cattle rustling, oyster poaching, livestock theft, and cargo theft. The second season looks at crop, lobster, and horse theft, elver poaching, and invasive species that threaten agriculture.

Season 1 (2018)

Season 2 (2021)

Reception 
The show has been praised for looking at the crimes with intelligence and respect. At the end of 2018, Farm Crime was named as one of the “25 most binge-worthy TV shows of 2018” by NOW Magazine. It also received positive reviews from Canadian entertainment websites, and was cited for its unique spin on the true crime genre.

Awards & Nominations 
The first season of Farm Crime was nominated for the Best Web Program or Series in Non-Fiction under the Digital Media category at the 2019 Canadian Screen Awards. The first season was also nominated for Best Web Non-Fiction Series at the Banff World Media Festival in the same year.

At the T.O. Webfest in 2019, the series was nominated for the IWCC Canadian Spotlight and Best Cinematography awards, and won the Best Canadian Series and Best Documentary Series awards.

References

External links 
 
 

CBC Gem original programming
2010s Canadian documentary television series
2018 Canadian television series debuts
Canadian non-fiction web series